Conchita is the debut studio album by Austrian pop singer Conchita Wurst. It was released on 15 May 2015 by Sony Music Entertainment. The album includes the singles "Heroes", "You Are Unstoppable" and her Eurovision Song Contest 2014 winning song, "Rise like a Phoenix".

Composition
Conchita incorporates different elements from multiple music genres into Conchita Wurst's typical baroque pop sound. Several electronic genres can be found on Conchita with influences from dubstep to house in general on "Out of Body Experience" and "Somebody to Love". For example, "You Are Unstoppable" and "Up for Air" draw heavily from electropop while fourth single "Colours of Your Love" includes club music in its composition. With "Firestorm" Wurst links house to Europop.

Singles
"Rise like a Phoenix", Wurst's winning entry at the Eurovision Song Contest 2014, was the first single to be released off the album on 18 March 2014. "Heroes" was the second single from the album released on 8 November 2014. "You Are Unstoppable" was released as the third single from the album on 5 March 2015. On 7 August 2015, "Firestorm"/"Colours of Your Love" was released as a double A-side and the fourth single.

Critical reception
In an early review of the album, Luis Gonzalez of Album Confessions wrote, "With a solid blend of pop, dance and opera, the artist's inspiring way with words creates powerful, impressive and soaring numbers that should bring a smile to any listener's face. Isn't that what pop music should do? Cause a smile? Wurst may use the persona of 'the bearded lady' to stand out from the crowd, but she really doesn't need it. Her beautiful performances across the album do all the talking."

Track listing

Charts

Weekly charts

Year-end charts

Certifications

Release history

References

2015 debut albums
Conchita Wurst albums
Sony Music albums